Yosef (Yossi) Brodny (born 15 January 1971) is an Israeli politician who is the head of the electoral slate for The Jewish Home for the 2022 Israeli legislative election and has been the mayor of the Israeli city of Giv'at Shmuel since 2008.

Early life
Brodny was born in Hadera. He served in the Israel Defense Forces (IDF) between 1989 until 1996, in the Paratroopers Brigade.

Political career
From 2003 to 2008, Brodny served as member of Giv'at Shmuel council. In 2008, he was elected mayor of Giv'at Shmuel. In 2009, he joined the Likud party. In October 2013, he was elected mayor again, this time without competing. On 18 July 2022, he was elected to the first position on the The Jewish Home's electoral list for the 2022 Israeli legislative election.

References

1971 births
Living people
Reichman University alumni
Israeli soldiers
Jewish Israeli politicians
Likud politicians
Mayors of places in Israel
People from Hadera